Humphrey Jackson (1784-1833) was a member of Stephen F. Austin's old 300 Colony. He most famously settled along the San Jacinto River near where the famous battle took place. His small settlement is now Crosby, Texas.

References

1784 births
1833 deaths
Old Three Hundred
People from Crosby, Texas